A reform school  was a penal institution, generally for teenagers mainly operating between 1830 and 1900. 
In the United Kingdom and its colonies reformatories commonly called reform schools were set up from 1854 onwards for youngsters who were convicted of a  crime as an alternative to an adult prison. In parallel, "Industrial schools" were set up for vagrants and children needing protection. Both were 'certified' by the government from 1857, and in 1932 the systems merged and both were 'approved' and became approved schools.

Both in the United Kingdom and United States, they came out of social concerns about cities, poverty, immigration, and vagrancy following industrialization, as well as from a shift in society's attitude from retribution, punishing the miscreant to reforming.

They were distinct from borstals (1902-1982 UK), which were enclosed juvenile prisons.

History
Social reformers in America in the late 19th and early 20th centuries almost invariably found fault with the then-usual practice of treating juvenile offenders essentially the same as adult criminals.  It was recognized that the juveniles were often sexually and otherwise exploited by the older inmates and that they were often receiving instruction in more advanced and serious ways of crime by hardened criminals.  As a result, rather than their sentences serving as a deterrent to future crimes, many juvenile offenders emerged from incarceration far worse than when they were first sentenced.

The reforms, which were adopted more readily in some states than others, consisted of a two-pronged approach: a separate juvenile code and juvenile courts for offenders who had not reached the age of majority, and the building of separate institutions for juvenile "delinquents" (the stigmatizing term "criminal" not being used).  Because the primary purpose of these institutions was to be rehabilitative rather than punitive, they were styled "reform schools".  For the most part, these institutions were custodial.

In the United Kingdom, reformatory schools  were provided for criminal children whilst industrial schools were intended to prevent vulnerable children from becoming criminal. There was a perceived rise in juvenile delinquency in the early 19th century; whereas in a rural economy very young children could gain paid employment doing tasks such as bird scaring and stone gathering these opportunities were not available in the cities. Children were very visible on the streets. In 1816, Parliament set up a ‘Committee for Investigating the Alarming Increase in Juvenile Crime in the Metropolis’, in 1837 the writer Charles Dickens published Oliver Twist, a story about a child involved in a street gang, and in 1846 it was recognised in the Juvenile Offences Act of 1846 that children under 14 should be tried in a special court not an adult court. Begging and vagrancy was rife, and it was these low level misdemeanours that caused the magistrates to send children to industrial schools to learn to be industrious, and learn skills that would make then more employable.

More serious crimes required an element of punishment in an environment away from older prisoners followed by education to reform their ways. The power to set up such an establishment was given in the 1854 Youthful Offenders Act (the Reformatory Schools Act). This provided financial assistance and support for reformatory schools  as an alternative to prison. Industrial schools were regularised three years later by the 1857 Industrial schools act.

In Australia, reform schools were established by the Neglected and Criminal Children Act 1864, which provided for children who came under state guardianship. In theory, children who were considered 'neglected' were sent to an industrial school, while those who had broken the law were sent to a reformatory. In practice however, older children tended to be sent to reformatories and younger ones to industrial schools, with little regard as to why they had been committed. The over-crowding and insanitary conditions of these schools, combined with poor diets and overwork, caused terrible health problems. Contagious disease was a big problem, particularly measles and eye diseases. The reform school system came to an end on 1887, due to public pressure, and government shifted its focus towards the use of foster homes.

In the 1950s and 1960s, many of the same problems that had occurred with the former system of incarcerating juveniles along with adults began to be noticed in reform school — older juveniles exploiting the younger ones, sexually and otherwise, and the younger ones taking the more hardened, usually older offenders as role models and mentors. Also, the term "reform school" itself, originally intended as destigmatizing, had developed its own stigma.

Modern view
Today, no state openly or officially refers to its juvenile correctional institutions as "reform schools", although such institutions still exist. The attempt has also been made to reduce the population of such institutions to the maximum extent possible, and to leave all but the most incorrigible youths in a home setting. Also, in an attempt to make the situation more socially normal, and in response to the rising number of young female offenders, many such institutions have been made coeducational.

The current approach involves minimizing the use of custodial institutions and the maximization of the use of less-restrictive settings which allow the youths to remain in their own homes, usually while attending during the daytime an institution called an alternative school or something similar, which is usually a more-structured version of a public school.  There may be court-monitored probation or other restrictions, such as a strict curfew applied to the clientele of the "Department of Youth Services" or whatever the state terms it, than for other youths the same age.

In the United States, the most well-known facilities meeting the general criteria for being colloquially labelled "reform schools" include the Lincoln Hills School near Merrill, Wisconsin (mentioned in episodes of the once-popular TV series Picket Fences) and the Preston School of Industry in Ione, California. The first publicly funded reform school in the United States was the State Reform School for Boys in Westborough, Massachusetts. It opened in 1848.

In Denmark, continuation high schools continue to be used as reform schools as they are much cheaper than youth detention centers, while the success rates are much the same. Today, there are no national guidelines regarding the severity of the crimes with which the children are charged; nor are there any guidelines in place to assist in the decision to send them to reform school in the first place, since each town or jurisdiction has its own bylaws and budgets. Children charged with making bomb threats end up in such places.

See also
 Alternative school
 Continuation high school
 George Junior Republic
 Therapeutic boarding school

References

External links
 

Juvenile law
School types